Sean Olson (born February 4, 1976) is an American film director, producer, screenwriter and editor. He began as an editor for KPHO-TV, KMGH-TV, Extra-TV and Crime Watch Daily and the feature films How the Garcia Girls Spent Their Summer (2005) which was in dramatic competition at the 2005 Sundance Film Festival and Wyatt Earp's Revenge (2012) starring Val Kilmer.  He edited the Hallmark original movie Christmas Under Wraps. Christmas Under Wraps was the highest rated telecast in Hallmark Channel history and the second highest rated cable movie in 2014.
Olson has directed The Contractor (2013), The Dog Who Saved Easter (2014), The Dog Who Saved Summer (2015), A Christmas Reunion (2015), The Other Mother (2017), F.R.E.D.I. (2018), Mommy Be Mine (2018) and Christmas Wonderland (2018) for Hallmark Movies & Mysteries. Olson's feature film F.R.E.D.I. won Best of Fest at the 2018 Bentonville Film Festival founded by Geena Davis and Best Family Film at the Burbank International Film Festival.

Max Winslow and the House of Secrets (2020) starring Chad Michael Murray won Best Feature Film at the 2019 Burbank International Film Festival, the 2020 Crystal Palace International Film Festival, and Best of Fest and Audience Choice at the 2019 Fayetteville Film Festival.  Max Winslow also won the Donor's Choice at the 2020 Phoenix International Film Festival. Olson was also nominated Best Director at the Canadian International Faith and Family Film Festival, it won Best Family Film at the fest.  Max Winslow was #2 at the box office in its opening weekend.

Feature films

Television series

References

1970 births
Living people
American cinematographers
American film editors
American film producers
American film production company founders
American male screenwriters
Film directors from Arizona
Film directors from Los Angeles
Film producers from California
Science fiction film directors
Screenwriters from California
Screenwriters from Arizona
Writers from Los Angeles
20th-century American writers